The Hooker Woodframe Grain Elevator is a grain elevator in Hooker, Oklahoma. The elevator was built in 1926 by the Riffe & Gilmore Co. and operated by the Wheat Pool Elevator Company. Located along the Beaver, Meade and Englewood Railroad, which ran from the east at Beaver, Oklahoma to the west at Keyes, Oklahoma (northeast of Boise City), the elevator served the local wheat industry.  It was one of several built to compete with the Chicago, Rock Island and Pacific Railroad elevators in the region. The elevator was added to the National Register of Historic Places on May 13, 1983 and is one of two National Register of Historic Places listings in Texas County, Oklahoma located around Hooker.

References

Agricultural buildings and structures on the National Register of Historic Places in Oklahoma
Industrial buildings completed in 1926
Buildings and structures in Texas County, Oklahoma
Grain elevators in Oklahoma
Agricultural buildings and structures on the National Register of Historic Places
National Register of Historic Places in Texas County, Oklahoma